The General Nathanael Greene Homestead, also known as Spell Hall, is a historic house at 20 Taft Street in Coventry, Rhode Island. It was the home of American Revolutionary War general Nathanael Greene from 1770 to 1776, and was owned afterwards by his brother Jacob Greene and his wife Margaret. The house is owned and operated by the General Nathanael Greene Homestead Association, a non-profit organization, and was opened as a museum in 1924.

Description
The house is a -story wood-frame structure with a gable roof, two interior chimneys, and clapboarded exterior.  It is five bays wide and two deep, with a center entry framed by pilasters and topped by a transom window, triangular pediment, and carved fanlight motif.  The house follows a typical late-Georgian center-hall plan, with four rooms on each level, two on either side of the central hall.  On the lower level, the front right room housed Nathanael Greene's 300+ volume library, while the rear room served as the kitchen.  The rooms on the left served as parlor and dining room.  There are four bedrooms on the second floor, and the attic space was later also converted into bedrooms.

History

The house was built by Nathanael Greene in 1770, part of a property encompassing , and served as his family's home through the Revolutionary War.  In 1783 Greene moved the family to Newport, before eventually relocating to Georgia, where he died in 1786.  This house he sold to his brother Jacob.  It remained in Greene family hands until 1899, although it became run-down and was used as a tenement house in the later years.  In 1919 the Nathanael Greene Homestead Association was formed to restore and care for the property.  It is now a house museum, open to the public.

It was declared a National Historic Landmark in 1972, and was included in the Anthony Village Historic District in 2010.

See also

List of National Historic Landmarks in Rhode Island
National Register of Historic Places listings in Kent County, Rhode Island

References

External links

Gen. Nathanael Greene Homestead Association

Images

National Historic Landmarks in Rhode Island
Museums in Kent County, Rhode Island
Houses on the National Register of Historic Places in Rhode Island
Houses completed in 1774
Historic house museums in Rhode Island
Biographical museums in Rhode Island
Buildings and structures in Coventry, Rhode Island
Historic American Buildings Survey in Rhode Island
Houses in Kent County, Rhode Island
National Register of Historic Places in Kent County, Rhode Island
Individually listed contributing properties to historic districts on the National Register in Rhode Island